Locust Street Historic District may refer to:

Locust Street, a major street in Center City Philadelphia
Locust Street Historic District (Florence, Alabama), listed on the National Register of Historic Places in Lauderdale County, Alabama
Locust Street Historic District (Washington, Missouri), listed on the National Register of Historic Places in Franklin County, Missouri